Magic Kids was an American indie pop and rock music band from Memphis, Tennessee. They were signed to True Panther Sounds, of Matador Records.

About
The band featured Bennett Foster (vocals, guitar), Will McElroy (keyboards), Ben Bauermeister (drums), Michael Peery (bass, vocals), Alex Gates (guitar, vocals), and Alice Buchanan (violin, keyboards, drums, vocals). Foster, Gates and McElroy were previously members of the Barbaras.

Discography
 Memphis (2010)

References

External links
Official site
Magic Kids at Myspace

Indie rock musical groups from Tennessee
Musical groups established in 2009
Musical groups from Memphis, Tennessee